Mary Winchester may refer to:

 Mary Winchester (Supernatural), a character in the American TV series Supernatural
 Mary Winchester (Zoluti) (1865–1955), Scottish girl captured and held hostage by the Mizo tribes of Mizoram, India, in 1871